is a Japanese screenwriter. He has composed the script and series composition for numerous anime series.

Works

Anime television series
1987: Tsuide ni Tonchinkan (script); debut series
1989: Mado King Granzort (script)
1989: Gaki Deka (script)
1990: Magical Angel Sweet Mint (script)
1991: Karasu Tengu Kabuto (script)
1991: Jankenman (script)
1992: Floral Magician Mary Bell (series composition)
1992: Calimero (script)
1993: Dragon League (series composition)
1993: Tanoshii Willow Town (script)
1994: Nanatsu no Umi no Tico (script)
1994: Akazukin Chacha (script)
1994: Mahoujin Guru Guru (script)
1996: Lupin III: The Secret of Twilight Gemini (script)
1996: Meiken Lassie (script)
1997: Tenchi in Tokyo (script)
1997: Mashin Hero Wataru (script)
1998: El-Hazard (script)
1998: All Purpose Cultural Cat Girl Nuku Nuku (script)
1998: Nessa no Hao Gandara (script)
1998: Cyberteam in Akihabara (script)
1998: Popolocrois (script)
1999: Wild Arms: Twilight Venom (script)
1999: Future Boy Conan (script)
2000: Dokidoki? Densetsu: Mahoujin Guru Guru (script)
2000: Gate Keepers (script)
2001: Samurai Girl: Real Bout High School (script)
2001: Nono-chan (script)
2004: Ragnarok The Animation (series composition)
2004: Fantastic Children (script)
2005: Mix Master (script)
2005: Kotencotenco (series composition)
2005-2006: Cho Positive! Fighters (series composition)
2006: Magikano (series composition, script)
2006: Naikaku Kenryoku Hanzai Kyōsei Torishimarikan: Zaizen Jotarō (series composition)
2006: Galaxy Angel-Rune (script)
2007: Master of Epic The Animation Age (script)
2007: Jūsō Kikō Dancouga Nova (story construction)
2007-2010: Reborn! (script)
2012: Arashi no Yoru ni (script)
2014: Nobunaga the Fool (script)

Anime films
1996: Mahōjin Guru Guru (script)

Original video animations
1990: Shiawase no Katachi (script)
1999: Taiyō no Fune: Sol Bianca (script)
2000-2002: Magical Canan (script)

External links
 

1963 births
Living people
Japanese screenwriters
Anime screenwriters
Writers from Chiba Prefecture